This is the results breakdown of the local elections held in Galicia on 26 May 1991. The following tables show detailed results in the autonomous community's most populous municipalities, sorted alphabetically.

Overall

City control
The following table lists party control in the most populous municipalities, including provincial capitals (shown in bold). Gains for a party are displayed with the cell's background shaded in that party's colour.

Municipalities

A Coruña
Population: 256,579

Ferrol
Population: 86,272

Lugo
Population: 81,493

Ourense
Population: 109,283

Pontevedra
Population: 70,356

Santiago de Compostela
Population: 91,419

Vigo
Population: 279,986

References

Galicia
1991